Han Sun-Hee (born June 9, 1973) is a South Korean team handball player and Olympic champion. She played for the Korean team and received a gold medal at the 1992 Summer Olympics in Barcelona. She received a silver medal at the 1996 Summer Olympics in Atlanta.

References

External links

1973 births
Living people
South Korean female handball players
Olympic handball players of South Korea
Handball players at the 1992 Summer Olympics
Handball players at the 1996 Summer Olympics
Handball players at the 2000 Summer Olympics
Olympic gold medalists for South Korea
Olympic medalists in handball
Asian Games medalists in handball
Handball players at the 1998 Asian Games
Medalists at the 1996 Summer Olympics
Medalists at the 1992 Summer Olympics
Olympic silver medalists for South Korea
Asian Games gold medalists for South Korea
Medalists at the 1998 Asian Games